Waterville is a town in Lamoille County, Vermont, United States. The population was 686 at the 2020 census.

Geography
Waterville is in northwestern Lamoille County, in the valley of the North Branch of the Lamoille River. The town is bordered to the west by Franklin County. Vermont Route 109 runs through the center of town, up the North Branch valley. It leads northeast (upstream)  to Vermont Route 118 at Belvidere Corners and southwest  to Jeffersonville in the town of Cambridge.

Demographics

As of the census of 2000, there were 697 people, 260 households, and 186 families residing in the town.  The population density was 42.5 people per square mile (16.4/km2).  There were 284 housing units at an average density of 17.3 per square mile (6.7/km2).  The racial makeup of the town was 97.27% White, 0.43% Native American, 0.29% Asian, and 2.01% from two or more races.

There were 260 households, out of which 38.1% had children under the age of 18 living with them, 58.1% were married couples living together, 6.5% had a female householder with no husband present, and 28.1% were non-families. 18.1% of all households were made up of individuals, and 4.2% had someone living alone who was 65 years of age or older.  The average household size was 2.62 and the average family size was 2.98.

In the town, the population was spread out, with 28.0% under the age of 18, 7.6% from 18 to 24, 30.1% from 25 to 44, 24.1% from 45 to 64, and 10.2% who were 65 years of age or older.  The median age was 36 years. For every 100 females, there were 113.1 males.  For every 100 females age 18 and over, there were 100.0 males.

The median income for a household in the town was $39,453, and the median income for a family was $42,857. Males had a median income of $34,250 versus $22,917 for females. The per capita income for the town was $18,081.  About 6.8% of families and 10.7% of the population were below the poverty line, including 9.4% of those under age 18 and 11.8% of those age 65 or over.

Culture 
Waterville is mentioned in an episode of Fox Network's television show Fringe "Brave New World, Part 2", as the epicenter of a microquake timed with microquakes in Albany, New York, and Worcester, Massachusetts, in an attempt to collapse two universes and create a new one.

The 20th-century American oil painter Emile Gruppe painted Waterville on several canvases from a variety of visual points of view, almost always including the church, the North Branch of the Lamoille River, and the Church Street covered bridge. Gruppe maintained a seasonal studio and painting school in the nearby village of Jeffersonville.

Notable people

 James M. Hotchkiss (1812–1877), member of the Vermont House of Representatives and Vermont Senate
 Luke P. Poland (1815–1887), U.S. senator and representative, justice of the Vermont Supreme Court

References

External links
 

 
Towns in Vermont
Towns in Lamoille County, Vermont